The Liberty Times is a national newspaper published in Taiwan. Founded by Lin Rong-San, it is published by the Liberty Times Group, which also publishes Taipei Times, an English language newspaper . The newspaper was first published on 17 April 1980, as Liberty Daily, before adopting its current name in 1987.

It is one of the four most influential newspapers in Taiwan, the other three being the Apple Daily, the China Times, and the United Daily News. While the United Daily News is regarded as taking an editorial line that supports a Pan-Blue political stance, the Liberty Times is thought to take a Pan Green pro-independence political stance.

Awards

References

External links
  

Chinese-language newspapers (Traditional Chinese)
Newspapers published in Taiwan
Newspapers established in 1980
Mass media in Taipei
1980 establishments in Taiwan
Taiwan independence movement